Superblues is an album by the drummer, Pete York. Recorded live on tour in Germany in 1991, it was not  released until 1994.

It contains a version of John Lee Hooker's hit "Dimples" which was also the first single released by The Spencer Davis Group in 1964;  and a cover of Ashton, Gardner and Dyke's 1971 hit, "Resurrection Shuffle". The track "Lover Man", the full title of which is "Lover Man (Oh Where Can You Be?)", was a 1941 hit song specially written for Billie Holiday.

Track listing
"High Heel Sneakers" (Higginbottam)
"Flip, Flop And Fly" (Calhoun, Big Joe Turner)
"Parchman Farm" (Mose Allison)
"Lover Man" (Jimmy Davis, Ram Ramirez, James Sherman)
"Dimples" (John Lee Hooker, James Bracken)
"Born Again"/"Get Back" (Davis/Dean + Lennon–McCartney)
"Ain't No Love In The Heart Of The City" (Michael Price, Dan Walsh)
"Never Too Old To Rock" (Mickey Jupp, Chris East)
"Resurrection Shuffle" (Tony Ashton)
"Out Of Time" (Jagger/Richards)
"Johnny B. Goode" (Chuck Berry)

Personnel
Chris Farlowe - vocals
Spencer Davis - guitar, vocals
Tony Ashton  - keyboards, vocals
Miller Anderson - guitar, vocals
Eddie Hardin - keyboards, vocals
Bea Gebauer - vocals
Dick Morrissey - saxophone
Roy Williams - trombone
Wolfgang Dahlheimer - keyboards
Harvey Weston - bass
Gary Twigg - bass
Pete York - drums, vocals

References
 The Musicians' Olympus Geocities

1994 live albums
Pete York albums
Live blues albums